Pavel Veleba (born 6 October 1976) is a Czech striker who played for Olympiakos Nicosia of Cyprus. Some of his other former teams are FK Teplice, Chmel Blšany, and SK Kladno.

References

External links
  World of Football
  Profile: ZeroZero

1976 births
Living people
Czech footballers
FK Viktoria Žižkov players
Bohemians 1905 players
FK Ústí nad Labem players
FK Teplice players
FK Chmel Blšany players
SK Kladno players
Expatriate footballers in Kazakhstan
FC Shakhter Karagandy players
Olympiakos Nicosia players
Expatriate footballers in Cyprus
Czech expatriate sportspeople in Kazakhstan
People from Roudnice nad Labem
Association football forwards
Czech First League players
Cypriot Second Division players
Kazakhstan Premier League players
Sportspeople from the Ústí nad Labem Region
Czech expatriate sportspeople in Cyprus